Kurubarapalli is a village in the Hosur taluk of Krishnagiri district, Tamil Nadu, India.

Demographics
The 2011 census recorded 5,354 residents, 2,760 males and 2,594 females. There were 742 children aged 0-6, and 502 members of scheduled castes.  The literacy rate of 67.22% was lower than the state average of 80.99%.

References 

 

Villages in Krishnagiri district